Cinema 500 km is a 2006 Saudi Arabian documentary film and was directed by Abdullah Al-Eyaf. The film depicts the experiences of Tariq Al-Husaini, a 21-year-old Saudi movie fan despite no cinemas and are available only on home video in Saudi Arabia. Al-Husaini is shown applying for a passport and traveling 500 kilometers to Bahrain to see a movie in a cinema for the first time.

Abdullah Al-Eyaf secured permission from the Saudi Ministry of Culture and Information to shoot this documentary. The film premiered at the Emirates Film Competition in Abu Dhabi, United Arab Emirates in 2006 , but due to the lack of cinemas in Saudi Arabia there are no plans yet to show the film in its home country.

External links
Abdullah Al-Eyaf

"Saudi Arabian film shows theaterless kingdom", Associated Press, MSNBC.com, April 28, 2006.
"'Cinema 500 km' — a Film About Watching a Film", Raid Qusti, Arab News, March 22, 2006.

2006 films
2006 documentary films
2000s Arabic-language films
Documentary films about the film industry
Films set in a movie theatre
Films set in Bahrain
Films set in Saudi Arabia
Saudi Arabian documentary films